Léa Sprunger (born 5 March 1990) is a former Swiss track and field athlete. Originally a heptathlete like her older sister Ellen, she began concentrating on the 200 metres and 400 metres in 2011, and then on the 400 metres hurdles from 2015. Her best times in the 400m and 400m hurdles of 50.52 s (2018) and 54.06 s (2019) are the Swiss records. She finished fifth in the 400m hurdles final at the 2017 World Championships, and went on to win the gold medal in the 400m hurdles at the 2018 European Championships.

Career
Born in Nyon, Vaud, Sprunger competed at the 2012 Summer Olympics in the women's 200 m event and the 4 × 100 m relay. At the 2016 Summer Olympics, she competed in the 400 m hurdles event and at the 2020 Summer Olympics in the 400 m hurdles event and the 4 × 400 m relay.

At the 2016 European Championships she finished third in the 400 m hurdles race. She won this event two years later at the 2018 European Championships.

Her personal best in the 400 m hurdles is 54.06 s set in Doha on 4 October 2019, also representing a new national record. She also holds the national record in the 400 metres with 50.52 s (set in La-Chaux-de-Fonds on 1 July 2018). In addition, she held the national record in the 200 metres for three years with 22.18 s (set in Geneva on 17 July 2016 and improved by Mujinga Kambundji on 24 August 2019).

Léa Sprunger retired from competitive athletics in September 2021.

International championships

1Disqualified in the final

2Did not finish in the final

3Disqualified in the semifinals

References

Living people
Swiss female sprinters
Swiss heptathletes
Olympic athletes of Switzerland
Athletes (track and field) at the 2012 Summer Olympics
Athletes (track and field) at the 2016 Summer Olympics
1990 births
People from Nyon
World Athletics Championships athletes for Switzerland
European Athletics Championships medalists
European Athletics Indoor Championships winners
Athletes (track and field) at the 2020 Summer Olympics
Olympic female sprinters
Sportspeople from the canton of Vaud